Year 1361 (MCCCLXI) was a common year starting on Friday (link will display the full calendar) of the Julian calendar.

Events 
 January–December 
 March 17 – An-Nasir Hasan, Mamluk Sultan of Egypt, is killed by one of his own mamluks, Yalbugha al-Umari, who, with the senior Mamluk emirs, has al-Mansur Muhammad installed as the new sultan.
 April 13 – The University of Pavia is founded, on the Italian Peninsula.
 July 27 – Battle of Visby: King Valdemar IV of Denmark conquers the city of Visby by defeating his peasant army. This allows Lübeck to become the new leading city of the Hanseatic League.
 October 10 – Edward, the Black Prince marries Joan of Kent at Windsor Castle.

 Date unknown 
 In the Marinid Empire in modern-day Morocco, Abu Salim Ibrahim is overthrown by Abu Umar, who is in turn overthrown by Abu Zayyan.
 The Blue Horde descends into anarchy. Between 1361 and 1378, over 20 khans succeed each other in different parts of the Blue Horde's territory.
 Chinese rebels capture the Goryeo capital.
 The earliest known musical keyboard instrument is built, with the layout of black and white keys that becomes standard.

Births 
 February 26 – Wenceslaus, King of the Romans, King of Bohemia (d. 1419)
 date unknown 
 John Beaumont, 4th Baron Beaumont, Constable of Dover Castle (d. 1396)
 Isabella, Countess of Foix, vassal ruler  (d. 1428)
 King Charles III of Navarre (d. 1425)
 She Xiang, Chinese tribute chieftain  (d. 1396)

Deaths 
 January 7 – Gerlach I of Nassau-Wiesbaden
 March 17 – An-Nasir Hasan, Mamluk Sultan of Egypt (b. 1334/35)
 March 23 – Henry of Grosmont, Duke of Lancaster, English soldier and diplomat
 May 21 – Orhan Ghazi,  Ottoman Sultan (b. 1274) 
 June 9 – Philippe de Vitry, French composer (b. 1291)
 June 15 – Johannes Tauler, German mystic theologian
 June 17 – Ingeborg of Norway, princess consort and regent of Sweden (b. 1301) 
 September 18 – Louis V, Duke of Bavaria (b. 1315)
 October 4 – John de Mowbray, 3rd Baron Mowbray, English baron (b. 1310)
 October 8 – John Beauchamp, 3rd Baron Beauchamp, Warden of the Cinque Ports
 November 21 – Philip I, Duke of Burgundy (plague) (b. 1346)
 date unknown
 Giovanni, son of Francesco Petrarch (plague)
 Richard Badew, Chancellor of the University of Cambridge
 Reynold Cobham, 1st Baron Cobham of Sterborough, English knight and diplomat (b. 1295)
 Hajji Beg, Barlas leader

References